Dick's Last Resort is a bar and restaurant chain in the United States, known for its intentional employment of an obnoxious staff. The chain consists of seventeen restaurants. The restaurant has its origins in Dallas with the original owner, Dick Chase's opening of a "fine-dining" establishment in 1985. The establishment was a complete failure, which resulted in bankruptcy. Rather than continue with the upscale restaurant motif, Dick retooled his efforts and decided to "go sloppy." Chase's likeness is still featured on their T-shirts and promotional materials. The end result was a success, leading to the creation of more locations.

In 1995, the company attempted to expand to Europe and opened a restaurant in London, but the effort was abandoned and the restaurant was sold in early 1996.

The company is now owned by Deja Vu, a large entertainment and restaurant conglomerate, and the concept has expanded to dozens of states.

Atmosphere

Dick's Last Resort teaches its servers to be obnoxious. In addition to the staff, the decor is considered to be "wacky." The restaurant uses picnic-style tables and paper tablecloths. Patrons of Dick's are expected to be insulted, or placed in uncomfortable situations. Adult bibs and large, hand-made, paper hats with insults written on them are given to diners to wear during their stay. There are no napkins on the tables; they are generally thrown at the customers by the serving staff.

Menu
Dick's menu is influenced by Southern cuisine, consisting of hamburgers, barbecue, and seafood items.

In addition to food and drink, Dick's offers souvenirs such as "Real Women Love Dick's" T-shirts and "I Love Dick's" bumper stickers.

See also 

 Edsel Ford Fong, known as the "world's rudest, worst, most insulting waiter"
 Ed Debevic’s
 The Wieners Circle, a Chicago-based hot dog joint staffed with profanity-spewing staff
 Karen's Diner, a retro- and pink-themed diner with intentionally rude staff
 Durgin-Park, a defunct Boston restaurant that encouraged staff to be surly

References

External links
Dick's Last Resort official website

Restaurant chains in the United States
Restaurants established in 1985
American companies established in 1985